Tabula Rasā is a collaborative album by American banjoist Béla Fleck together with Vishwa Mohan Bhatt (playing traditional Indian slide guitar "Mohan veena") and Jie-Bing Chen, who plays the traditional Chinese two-string fiddle erhu. The unusual combination of Fleck's banjo together with these traditional instruments creates a unique sound on this album, which was nominated for the Grammy Award for Best World Music Album at the 39th Grammy Awards.

Track listing
"Carukesi" (Vishwa Mohan Bhatt) – 6:42
"Emperor's Mare" (Traditional) – 1:39
"Radha Krsna Lila" (Ronu Majumdar) – 6:42
"John Hardy" (Traditional) – 2:29
"Tabula Rasā" (Béla Fleck) – 3:06
"Geocentricity" (Fleck) – 6:07
"The Way Of Love" (Fleck) – 4:15
"Earl In Shanghai" (Fleck) – 4:59
"Water Gardens" (Traditional) – 4:36
"The Jade Princess" (Fleck) – 2:57
"The Dancing Girl" (Bhatt) – 10:20

Personnel
Béla Fleck - banjo
Vishwa Mohan Bhatt - Mohan veena
Jie-Bing Chen - Erhu
Ronu Majumdar - Bansuri
Sangeeta Shankar - violin
Poovalur Sriji (Srinivasan) - Mridangam

References

1996 albums
Béla Fleck albums
Water Lily Acoustics albums